Kontovazaina is a village and a former municipality in Arcadia, Peloponnese, Greece. Since the 2011 local government reform it is part of the municipality Gortynia, of which it is a municipal unit. The municipal unit has an area of 137.496 km2. In 2011 its population was 386 for the village and 1,171 for the municipal unit. Achaea borders the municipal unit to the north and Elis to the west. It is situated in mountainous northwestern Arcadia, between the rivers Erymanthos and Ladon. The Ladon reservoir is in easternmost part of the municipal unit, and the mountain Afrodisio (1,447 m elevation) is in the north. The village Kontovazaina is situated in a valley, 3 km north of the Ladon. It is considered a traditional settlement.

Subdivisions
The municipal unit Kontovazaina is subdivided into the following communities (constituent villages in brackets):
Dimitra (Dimitra, Stavri)
Kardaritsi
Kontovazaina
Monastiraki (Monastiraki, Arsinaia, Peleki)
Paralongoi (Paralongoi, Agios Nikolaos, Petas)
Vachlia (Vachlia, Pera Vachlia)
Velimachi (Velimachi, Aposkia, Soudeli)
Vidiaki
Voutsis

Population

See also
List of settlements in Arcadia
List of traditional settlements of Greece

References

External links
www.kontovazena.gov.gr
www.k-gortynia.gr
Kontovazaina at the GTP Travel Pages

Populated places in Arcadia, Peloponnese